The 1962 Cal Poly Pomona Broncos football team represented the Cal Poly Kellogg-Voorhis Unit—now known as California State Polytechnic University, Pomona—as an independent during the 1962 NCAA College Division football season. Led by sixth-year head coach Don Warhurst, Cal Poly Pomona compiled a record of 9–1. The team outscored its opponents 219 to 74 for the season. The Broncos were ranked as high as No. 12 in the UPI Small College poll and finished the year at No. 13. They played fives home games at Kellogg Field in Pomona, California one at Mt. San Antonio College in Walnut, California.

Schedule

Notes

References

Cal Poly Pomona
Cal Poly Pomona Broncos football seasons
Cal Poly Pomona Broncos football